The Mississippi State Bulldogs men's basketball program represents Mississippi State University in Starkville, Mississippi, in men's NCAA Division I basketball. The Bulldogs play in the Southeastern Conference. Mississippi State has qualified for the NCAA tournament 12 times and most recently in 2023. The Bulldogs best finish in the NCAA tournament came in 1996 when they advanced to the Final Four. On March 20, 2022, Mississippi State named former New Mexico State head coach Chris Jans as its 21st head basketball coach.

History 

The Bulldogs have been to the NCAA Tournament eleven times, the first time in 1963 and the most recent being 2019. Mississippi State chose not to accept previous bids because state officials viewed African-Americans as inferior and would not allow Ole Miss or Mississippi State to play against teams with African-American players.  The 1963 team, however, famously snuck out of the state in the dead of night to play in what has since been dubbed the "Game of Change".

Six of the ten NCAA appearances have been earned in the past 10 seasons under former MSU Head Basketball Coach, Rick Stansbury. They have won 10 conference championships, four as a member of the now-dissolved Southern Intercollegiate Athletic Association in 1912, 1913, 1914, and 1916 in addition to six SEC titles in 1959, 1961, 1962, 1963, 1991, and 2004. The Bulldogs have won four conference tournament championships, one as a member of the Southern Conference in 1923 and three SEC tournament titles in 1996, 2002, and 2009. Mississippi State has several notable alumni including Erick Dampier, Bailey Howell, and Jarvis Varnado.

Coaches
Mississippi State's most successful coaches include Babe McCarthy, Richard Williams, and Rick Stansbury.  Babe McCarthy's place in history includes taking his team to the 1963 NCAA Tournament under the cover of darkness despite the Mississippi Governor's court order restricting their participation.

†NCAA canceled all postseason activities for all college sports due to the COVID-19 virus.

Rivals

As in all sports, Mississippi State's rival is Ole Miss. Mississippi State leads the series over Ole Miss 142–112.  Former MSU Head Coach Rick Stansbury is 21–8 vs the Rebels. Former head coach Ben Howland, was 6–9 against the Rebels.

Mississippi State and Alabama are considered rivals on the court, with only 90 miles separating the two programs. The Crimson Tide lead the all-time series 120–74.

Former players

All-Americans

Notable basketball players who attended and played at Mississippi State University.
Arnett Moultrie, 1st round, 2012 NBA draft.
Jarvis Varnado, 2nd round, 2010 NBA draft. NCAA career record holder with 564 blocked shots. One of only two college players to have at least 1000 points, 1000 rebounds, and 500 blocked shots, the other being David Robinson.
Lawrence Roberts, 2nd round, 2005 NBA draft.
 Timmy Bowers, 2006 Israeli Basketball Premier League MVP
Malik Newman (born 1997), basketball player in the Israeli Basketball Premier League
Derrick Zimmerman, 2nd round, 2003 NBA draft.
Tyrone Washington, 2nd round, 1999 NBA draft.
Dontae' Jones, 1st round, 1996 NBA draft.
Erick Dampier, 1st round, 1996 NBA draft.
Jeff Malone, 1st round, 1983 NBA draft. Two time NBA All-Star.
Rickey Brown, 1st round, 1980 NBA draft.
Wiley Peck, 1st round, 1979 NBA draft.
Bailey Howell, 1st round, 1959 NBA draft. Six time NBA All-Star. Elected to the Naismith Memorial Basketball Hall of Fame in 1997.

SEC West Division titles
The years the Bulldogs won were as follows: 1995, 1996, 2003, 2004, 2007, 2008, 2010

Postseason

NCAA tournament results
The Bulldogs have appeared in the NCAA tournament 12 times. Their combined record is 11–12.

The Bulldogs qualified for the 1959 tournament but university president Benjamin F. Hilbun would not permit the team to participate in the tournament where they would face African-American players.

NIT results
The Bulldogs have appeared in the National Invitation Tournament (NIT) 11 times. Their combined record is 13–11.

Awards

NCAA Defensive Player of the Year

SEC Coach of the Year

SEC Player of the Year

SEC Defensive Player of the Year

Howell Trophy Award winners

Retired numbers

Mississippi State has retired one jersey number for Bailey Howell, doing so on February 7, 2009 at the Coliseum. Mississippi State has also honored two others with honorary banners.

Honored jerseys

See also
Mississippi State Bulldogs men's basketball statistical leaders

References

External links